Carlos H. Rich (February 11, 1841– May 29, 1918) was a Canadian-born soldier who fought for the Union Army during the American Civil War. He received the Medal of Honor for valor.

Biography
Rich received the Medal of Honor on January 4, 1895, for his actions at the Battle of the Wilderness, Virginia on May 5, 1864, while with Company K of the 4th Vermont Volunteer Infantry Regiment.

Medal of Honor citation

Citation:

The President of the United States of America, in the name of Congress, takes pleasure in presenting the Medal of Honor to First Sergeant Carlos H. Rich, United States Army, for extraordinary heroism on 5 May 1864, while serving with Company K, 4th Vermont Infantry, in action during the Wilderness Campaign, Virginia. First Sergeant Rich saved the life of an officer.

See also

List of American Civil War Medal of Honor recipients: Q–S

References

External links

1841 births
1918 deaths
Union Army soldiers
United States Army Medal of Honor recipients
American Civil War recipients of the Medal of Honor
Canadian-born Medal of Honor recipients